Strom Howard Peterson (born 1967 or 1968) is a member of the Washington State House of Representatives representing the 21st Legislative District. In September 2023, Peterson was appointed to serve on the Snohomish County Council.

Career 
Strom was appointed to the Edmonds City Council in 2009. He retained his seat in 2009 and was reelected to the Council in 2013. He served for two years as the Council's President.

Strom finished second in the August primary, defeating three other Democratic candidates. In the November election, Strom defeated McPheeters with over 60% of the vote

References

1960s births
Year of birth uncertain
Living people
Democratic Party members of the Washington House of Representatives
21st-century American politicians